Emerson Duarte (born 18 October 1971) is a Brazilian sports shooter. He competed in the men's 25 metre rapid fire pistol event at the 2016 Summer Olympics.

References

External links
 

1971 births
Living people
Brazilian male sport shooters
Olympic shooters of Brazil
Shooters at the 2016 Summer Olympics
Place of birth missing (living people)
Pan American Games medalists in shooting
Pan American Games silver medalists for Brazil
Shooters at the 2015 Pan American Games
South American Games silver medalists for Argentina
South American Games gold medalists for Brazil
South American Games medalists in shooting
Competitors at the 2010 South American Games
Medalists at the 2015 Pan American Games
20th-century Brazilian people
21st-century Brazilian people